Rear may refer to:

Animals
Rear (horse), when a horse lifts its front legs off the ground
In stockbreeding, to breed and raise

Humans
Parenting (child rearing),  the process of promoting and supporting a child from infancy to adulthood
Gender of rearing,  the gender in which parents rear a child

Military
Rear (military), the area of a battlefield behind the front line
Rear admiral,  a naval officer

See also
 Rear end (disambiguation)
 Behind (disambiguation)
 Hind (disambiguation)